The Bonifacio Shrine, also known as the Kartilya ng Katipunan or Heroes Park, is a public park and plaza in Ermita, Manila, Philippines located just north of the Manila City Hall and south of Mehan Garden and Liwasang Bonifacio.  Its centerpiece is the monument to Filipino revolutionary Andrés Bonifacio and the Philippine Revolution fronting Padre Burgos Avenue.

History 
The Bonifacio and the Katipunan Revolution Monument, situated within the grounds of the Bonifacio Shrine, and designed by Filipino sculptor Eduardo Castrillo, was unveiled in 1998.  On September 21, 2006, the Victims of Martial law Memorial Wall was inaugurated at the park under the leadership of Mayor Lito Atienza. In 2019, the plaza was rehabilitated upon the orders of Mayor Isko Moreno who ordered the removal of occupying vendors, additional flora, planting of Bermuda grass and a central fountain in front of the Bonifacio monument. The city's continuous cleanup and removal of illegal vendors made visible the bronze monument commemorating Emilio Jacinto, which had been obscured for several years.

A musical dancing fountain was installed in front of the shrine monument. It was inaugurated in February 2020.

References 

Parks in Manila
Plazas in Manila
Landmarks in the Philippines
Tourist attractions in Manila